Argentina held national presidential and legislative elections on Sunday, 28 October 2007, and elections for provincial governors took place on staggered dates throughout the year. For the national elections, each of the 23 provinces and the Autonomous City of Buenos Aires are considered electoral districts. Voter turnout was 76.2%. Buenos Aires Province Senator and First Lady Cristina Fernández de Kirchner of the Front for Victory won the election by 45.28% of votes against Elisa Carrió of Civic Coalition ARI, making her the second female president of Argentina and the first female president to be directly elected. She broke the 40 percent barrier and won in the first round. Elisa Carrió won in the city of Buenos Aires and came second with more than 20 percent of the votes. Third was Roberto Lavagna, who won in Córdoba.

Background 
Elections for a successor to President Néstor Kirchner were held in October. Kirchner, although not term-limited had declined to run for a second term.

In addition to the President, each district elected a number of members of the Lower House (the Chamber of Deputies) roughly proportional to their population, and eight districts elected members to the Argentine Senate, where each district is entitled to three senators (two for the majority, one for the largest minority party). In most provinces, the national elections were conducted in parallel with local ones, whereby a number of municipalities elect legislative officials (concejales) and in some cases also a mayor (or the equivalent executive post).  Each provincial election follows local regulations and some, such as Tucumán, hold municipal elections on other dates in the year.

According to the rules for elections in Argentina, to win the presidential election without needing a "ballotage" round, a candidate needs either more than 45% of the valid votes, or more than 40% of the valid votes with a margin of 10 points from the runner-up. Following months of speculation, and despite high approval ratings, President Kirchner confirmed his decision to forfeit the 2007 race, and the ruling Front for Victory (FpV), a center-left Peronist Party, nominated the First Lady and Senator Cristina Fernández de Kirchner, on July 19. Acknowledging the support of a growing number of UCR figures ("K Radicals") to the populist policies advanced by Kirchnerism, the FpV nominated Mendoza Province Governor Julio Cobos as her running mate.

The ideologically diverse field also included former Economy Minister Roberto Lavagna (who broke with Kirchner in late 2005, obtained the endorsement of the UCR, and ran slightly to the right of the FpV), Elisa Carrió (a center-left Congresswoman close to the Catholic Church), and numerous conservatives and socialists; in all, fourteen candidates registered for the election. The UCR, for the first time since it first ran in a presidential campaign in 1892, joined a coalition (Lavagna's UNA) rather than nominate its own candidate.

The President, who had maintained high approval ratings throughout his term on the heels of a strong recovery in the Argentine economy, was beset by controversies during 2007, including Commerce Secretary Guillermo Moreno's firing of Graciela Bevacqua (the INDEC statistician overseeing inflation data), allegations of Planning Minister Julio de Vido's involvement in a Skanska bribery case, and the "suitcase scandal." These controversies, however, did not ultimately overshadow positive consumer sentiment and a generally high presidential job approval.

The Front for Victory's candidate, Senator and First Lady Cristina Fernández de Kirchner, maintained a comfortable lead in polling during the campaign.  Her opponents focused on forcing her into a ballotage. However, with 13 challengers splitting the vote, Fernández won a decisive first-round victory with 45.3% of the valid votes, more than 22 points ahead of runner-up Carrió.  She won in every province or district except San Luis (won by Alberto Rodríguez Saá), Córdoba (won by Lavagna), and the City of Buenos Aires (won by Carrió). Carrió, who obtained 23%, made history as the first runner-up to another woman in a national election in the Americas.

Presidential candidates 
A total of 14 candidates were on the presidential ballot, although only 3 or 4 garnered statistically significant amounts of support in polls. The candidates were as follows:
Cristina Fernández de Kirchner: A center-left Peronist, wife of then-president Néstor Kirchner and his chosen successor, since he declined to run for reelection. She won the presidency in the first round with about 45% of the vote.
Elisa Carrió: A former Radical Civic Union lawmaker who left the party after President Fernando de la Rúa abandoned his left-wing allies. She participated in the 2003 election and reached fifth place. Close to the influential Catholic Church, she ran a center-left platform with running mate Rubén Héctor Giustiniani and came in second with about 23% of the vote.
Roberto Lavagna: Former Minister of Economy under Néstor Kirchner, who broke ranks with the president in late 2005. He received support from moderate Peronists and was endorsed by the centrist Radical Civic Union, in lieu of putting forth a candidate themselves. He ran on a platform described as "center-progressive" and came in third, with 17% of the vote. His running mate was Gerardo Rubén Morales.
Alberto Rodríguez Saá: Governor of San Luis Province. He represented conservative Peronists opposed to Néstor Kirchner. His running mate was Héctor María Maya.
Fernando Solanas: The renowned film maker represented the Authentic Socialist Party. Running mate: Ángel Francisco Cadelli.
Jorge Omar Sobisch: Governor of Neuquén Province. Representing various conservative regional parties. Running mate: Jorge Asís.
Ricardo López Murphy: Representing the center-right Recreate for Growth party, in alliance with the Republican Proposal party of newly elected Buenos Aires mayor Mauricio Macri. He previously ran in the 2003 election, reaching third place. Running mate: Esteban Bullrich.
Vilma Ripoll: Running mate: Héctor Bidonde, both longtime Socialists.
Néstor Pitrola: Representing the Trotskyist Workers' Party. Running mate: Gabriela Adriana Arroyo.
José Alberto Montes: A Trotskyite who opposed privatizations under Carlos Menem. His running mate was Héctor Antonio Heberling.
Luis Alberto Ammann: Representing the Humanist Party-led Broad Front Towards Latin American Unity Alliance. Running mate: Rogelio Deleonardi.
Raúl Castells: A piquetero (poverty activist) who participated in various incidents. His running mate was his wife, Nina Pelozo.
Gustavo Luis Breide Obeid: A right-wing nationalist who participated in a failed coup against Carlos Menem in 1990. Running mate: Héctor Raúl Vergara.
Juan Ricardo Mussa: Perennial candidate and self-styled "traditional" Peronist. Running mate: Bernardo Nespral.

Results

President

Chamber of Deputies

Results by province

Senate

Results by province

Governors 

The elections for governors took place in ten provinces in September, which were won in six provinces by Kirchner's Front for Victory. Hermes Binner was elected governor of Santa Fe, defeating Peronist Rafael Bielsa, the former Minister of Foreign Affairs for Pres. Néstor Kirchner. Binner thus became the first Socialist governor in Argentina's history and the first non-Justicialist elected governor of that province. Center-left Fabiana Ríos (ARI) became the first woman elected governor in Argentina, winning an upset in Tierra del Fuego Province, while the moderately conservative Mauricio Macri was elected Mayor of Buenos Aires (an office similar to governor) in June 2007.

Corrientes Province and Santiago del Estero Province did not have elections for governors in 2007, as they had already taken place in 2005.

References

External links 

 National Electoral Direction – Ministry of Interior of Argentina
 Argentina Elections
 Official Election Results

2007 elections in Argentina
Presidency of Cristina Fernández de Kirchner
2007